The Forest Avenue School is a historic one-room schoolhouse in Brockton, Massachusetts.  The school, originally located on Forest Avenue, was built in 1875 and operated until 1963.  It is a two-story wood-frame structure, with a single classroom on the first floor, and an open play area on the second.  The building was moved to the (then) new Brockton High School grounds, on Concord Avenue (now Memorial Drive), in 1969.  It currently serves as the Little Red Schoolhouse Museum with exhibits of local history.

The building was listed on the National Register of Historic Places in 1982.

See also
National Register of Historic Places listings in Plymouth County, Massachusetts

References

External links
 Brockton Public Schools: Little Red Schoolhouse

School buildings completed in 1875
School buildings on the National Register of Historic Places in Massachusetts
Buildings and structures in Brockton, Massachusetts
Museums in Plymouth County, Massachusetts
National Register of Historic Places in Plymouth County, Massachusetts